A memorial to the British soldiers in the Korean War was unveiled in Victoria Embankment Gardens, between the River Thames and the Ministry of Defence headquarters in London, England, in December 2014. The memorial, a bronze statue of a British soldier by the sculptor Philip Jackson, with a Portland stone obelisk on a Welsh slate base, was a gift from the Government of South Korea and was unveiled in a ceremony led by Prince Richard, Duke of Gloucester.

See also
Gloucester Valley Battle Monument, a memorial site for British troops in South Korea
United Nations Memorial Cemetery, South Korea, where most of the British soldiers killed in the war are buried

References

External links
 

2014 establishments in England
2014 sculptures
British military memorials and cemeteries
Bronze sculptures in the United Kingdom
Cultural infrastructure completed in 2014
Statues in the City of Westminster
Korean War memorials and cemeteries
Limestone sculptures in the United Kingdom
Military memorials in London
Outdoor sculptures in London
South Korea–United Kingdom relations
Victoria Embankment
Sculptures by Philip Jackson